Suining County is under the administration of Xuzhou, Jiangsu province, China; it is the southernmost county-level division of Xuzhou and borders the prefecture-level cities of Suqian to the east and Suzhou of Anhui to the south and west.

History 
Suining basically was a part of former Suiling county by the Han. The seat of the Suiling was relocated to present-day Suining during the Three Kingdoms, and Suiling was merged into Suqian later. In 1218, it became a separate county seated at the old walled city of Suqian, and named "Suining" (literally: Bring peace to the Sui basin). The county was defunct in early Yuan, but restored in 1275. It was under Pizhou of Huai'an until Pizhou became a part of Xuzhou in 1733.

The ancient city Xiapi, where Pizhou used to seated is located in Gupi Town.

Administration 
Suining County is divided into 3 subdistricts and 15 towns.
3 subdistricts
 Suicheng
 Jincheng
 Suihe-is upgraded from town.

15 towns

Climate

Education
Suining Senior High School
Wenhua Middle School
Ninghai Middle School
Jinghua Middle School
Shuren Middle School
Liji Middle School

Transport 
Xuzhou Guanyin Airport is located in Shuanggou Town.

The town is served by two railway stations both located on the Xuzhou–Yancheng high-speed railway: Guanyin Airport and Suining.

References 

County-level divisions of Jiangsu
Administrative divisions of Xuzhou